Ice Cream Cake is the debut Korean extended play by South Korean girl group Red Velvet. It was released digitally on March 17, 2015, and physically on March 18 by SM Entertainment and distributed by Dreamus,marking the group's first proper release since their initial debut in August 2014 and their first release as a quintet since the addition of the group's fifth member Yeri. The extended play was released in two physical versions, named after the two singles and contained six tracks which introduced both the group's "Red" and "Velvet" sonic concept. The duality was further demonstrated by its two singles (marketed as double title tracks), "Automatic" and "Ice Cream Cake", with the latter becoming the group's breakthrough commercial success. S.M. founder Lee Soo-man served as the EP's executive producer, with Hayley Aitken, Trinity Music, Daniel "Obi" Klein, Charli Taft, Jam Factory, Kenzie, Teddy Riley, Cha Cha Malone, MonoTree and others contributed lyrics and production.

Upon its release, Ice Cream Cake received positive reviews from music critics for its "impressive effort" of establishing the two sides of their musical identity. The EP also attained commercial success, becoming Red Velvet's first chart-topper on the Gaon Album Chart in South Korea and number two on the Billboard World Albums Chart for the first time, while peaking at number twenty-four on Billboard's Heatseekers Albums chart. It has since sold a cumulative sales of over 94,000 copies.

Background and release
Following the end of "Be Natural" promotion in late October 2014, it was announced that Red Velvet would return with an extended play, marking their first proper release since the group's debut in last August. In February 2015, Red Velvet was spotted filming in a desert just outside of Palmdale, California with then SM Rookies-member Yeri, with the then-rumored song title to be "Blonde Girl", when they were actually filming the music video for "Ice Cream Cake". Yeri was then introduced by S.M. Entertainment as the fifth member of Red Velvet through two videos uploaded on the label's YouTube channel on March 11 and March 12, which contained audio previews of then-unknown album track "Somethin Kinda Crazy". On the same day, they revealed the title of the group's first album, Ice Cream Cake. On March 14, the music video for "Automatic" was released days prior to the EP's release, with title track "Ice Cream Cake" followed suit on March 16. SM Entertainment confirmed that the group would be promoting both "Ice Cream Cake" and "Automatic". The mini-album was released in two versions, Ice Cream Cake and Automatic. While there are no changes in the track list, the Automatic version has an alternative cover which features the original artwork in black and white, along with the design of the physical disc and the photo book inside is different from the other version.

Composition

Concept 
Not only does the group's name "Red Velvet" represent their two different images, it also represents the duality sonic concept that the group was focusing on since their debut in 2014. While the "Red" concept shows the group's "sweet, bubblegum side", the "Velvet" concept highlights the group as "sultry sirens" with "slow-burning, Janet Jackson-esque R&B jam". Ice Cream Cake marks the first release from Red Velvet to contain both "Red" and "Velvet" compositions, which was eventually followed by two different releases that focused solely on a single sonic concept: The Red in September 2015 and The Velvet in March 2016.

Songs 
The extended play starts with the same-name track "Ice Cream Cake", a "punchy, sugary pop confection" that consists elements from dance-rock, bubblegum-pop and drum and bass. Produced by Hayley Aitken and producing team Trinity Music, the song original title was "Ice Cream Truck" before the lyrics was rewritten in Korean by songwriter Jo Yoon-kyung and Kim Dong-hyun. In addition, it also features "haunted" harmony which can be heard during the intro of the song, while being accompanied by the sound of a music box. The lyrics tell the excitement of a girl being attracted to her boyfriend, using "ice cream cake" as a metaphor to the girl's feelings. Along with the electro-pop "Stupid Cupid" and the bright, poppy "Take It Slow", the three tracks represent the "Red" concept, with "Stupid Cupid" offers a different "aura" through the electric riffs, and "Take It Slow" highlights the group's harmonization and soft vocals that recalls "the perfection" from fellow labelmate Girls' Generation-TTS.In contrast, the second track "Automatic" is "a surely implemented R&B track" with influence from neo soul, thus represents the "Velvet" sonic concept. Produced by Daniel "Obi" Klein and British singer-songwriter Charli Taft, the song was the first work from the duo with Red Velvet (who would later participate in the group's upcoming releases). Lyrically, the song tells how "natural" and "automatic" the senses and feelings of a girl come just by the touch of her lover, with the opening monologue "How do you like this beat?/Natural and automatic for you." Charli Taft also co-produced the third track "Something Kinda Crazy", a modern-R&B track with synth-pop influence that sings about the starstruck feelings of a girl when she falls in a relationship. The lyrics was written by songwriter Kenzie, with American producer Teddy Riley joined in the production. The closing track "Candy" is a "smoothing, popping" R&B track that sings about the wishes of a long-lasting relationship. These three tracks eventually represent the group's "Velvet" concept, portraying the group's "sultry" images and music.

Promotion 
SM Entertainment announced a program where the group would promote their new EP, called Ice Cream TV. The group performed the songs live on the show, which was streamed through Naver Music and was hosted by Shinee's Minho. Besides their live performances, the group also talked about the new album and their 'comeback'.

The group started promoting their singles "Automatic" and "Ice Cream Cake" on music shows on March 19. They first performed the songs on Mnet's M Countdown, followed by performances on KBS' Music Bank on March 20 and SBS' Inkigayo on March 22. They returned to Music Bank a week later and won their first music show trophy since their official debut. They had their first overseas performance of "Ice Cream Cake" and their first as a 5-member group in an SM Town concert held in Taiwan. The group has also promoted and performed songs from the album in the Philippines for the Best of the Best K-pop Concert on April 12, a concert which also featured labelmates Super Junior and Girls' Generation as well as Cube boy band BTOB. The group also had its first promotions in the United States at KCON on August 2 at the Staples Center in downtown Los Angeles. The group participated in a fan engagement session at the Los Angeles Convention Center and performed songs "Ice Cream Cake", "Somethin' Kinda Crazy", and "Happiness" during the concert.

Reception
Upon its initial release, Ice Cream Cake received positive reviews from most music critics for showcasing the duality sonic concept of the group. Jakob Dorof of pop music magazine Spin described the track "Ice Cream Cake" as "a treat as unexpected as it is unpredictable [...] packs a punch, but goes down smooth over time" and deemed it "the SM label's specialty: bubblegum pop that deeply rewards repeat rotations." Billboard's Jeff Benjamin called the album "an impressive effort for such a young group" and praised its ability to personify the group's dual-sided musical identity through the singles "Ice Cream Cake" and "Automatic." He explained: "The former track is a punchy, sugary pop confection that [...] seems to represent the outfit's sweet bubblegum side; their "Red" side if you will. While the latter is a slow-burning, Janet Jackson-esque R&B jam that [...] positions them as sultry sirens; their "Velvet" side." In a positive review for the EP, writer Kim Do-hyun of IZM complemented the strong R&B influence in the release, while noting that the release is "an independent statement" for the group, choosing the two singles, "Something Kinda Crazy" and "Take It Slow" to be the highlights of the EP. Another review from Seoulbeats described the EP as "an earnestly sweet album that shows the wide range of talent the ladies of Red Velvet possess." The two singles would later appear in the top 25 Red Velvet songs by Billboard, with "Automatic" at number nine and "Ice Cream Cake" at number eighteen.

Commercial performance 
On the week of March 15, 2015, Ice Cream Cake debuted and spent one week at number one on the weekly Gaon Album Chart, giving the group their first chart-topping title. All six songs from the album eventually charted in the same week on Gaon Singles Chart. The album went on to become the best selling album by a girl group in South Korea on the Hanteo Chart for the first half of 2015. With a total of 48,815 copies sold in 2015, the extended play was the 50th best-selling release on the 2015's Gaon Year-End Album Chart, and later achieved a cumulative sales of over 88,000 copies as of September 2018. It also debuted at number two on Billboard's World Albums Chart, becoming their first charting entry. The album also peaked at 25 on Billboard's Top Heatseekers on April 4, 2015. The album is also the group's first appearance on the Japan's Oricon Albums Chart, peaking at number 76 for one week.

Track listing

Personnel 
Credits are from the album liner notes.

 S.M. Entertainment Co., Ltd.  executive producer
 Lee Soo-man  producer
 Kim Cheol-soon  recording engineer
 Jeong Ui-seok  recording engineer
 Lee Min-kyu  recording engineer
 Kim Hyeon-gon  recording engineer
 Oh Seong-goon  recording engineer
 Jeong Gi-hong  recording engineer
 Jeong Eun-kyeong  recording engineer
 G-high  recording engineer
 Nam Goong-jin  mixing engineer
 Goo Jong-pil  mixing engineer
 Kim Cheol-soon  mixing engineer
 Jeong Ui-seok  mixing engineer
 Jeon-hoon  mastering engineer
 Shin Soo-min  assistant mastering engineer

 Steven Myungkyu Lee  English supervision
 Min Hui-jin  creative director
 Shin Hui-won  music video director ("Automatic")
 Kim Seong-ook  music video director ("Ice Cream Cake")
 Min Hui-jin  design
 Jo Woo-cheol  design
 Kim Ye-min  design
 Madame Lolina  illustration
 Choi Min-hye  stylist
 Kim Joo-hee  make-up artist ("Automatic")
 Shin Gyeong-mi  make-up artist ("Automatic")
 Kim Joo-hee  make-up artist ("Ice Cream Cake")
 Lee Ji-hyeon  hair stylist ("Automatic")
 Jeong Seon-i  hair stylist ("Ice Cream Cake")
 Min Hui-jin  photography
 Kim Ye-min  photography assistant
 Young-min Kim  executive supervisor

Charts

Weekly charts

Monthly charts

Year-End charts

Sales

Release history

References

Red Velvet (group) EPs
2015 debut EPs
SM Entertainment EPs
Korean-language EPs
Dance-pop EPs
Concept albums